Dunkin’ Raptors is a Thai professional basketball team located in Bangkok. The team competes in the Thailand Basketball League.

Notable players
To appear in this section a player must have either:
- Set a club record or won an individual award as a professional player.
- Played at least one official international match for his senior national team 
 Supachai Sangthong 
 Siphandone Lothalath 
 John Foronda 
 Michael Fey 
 Jamarr Johnson

References

External links
Presentation at Asia-basket.com
Presentation at facebook.com

Basketball teams in Bangkok
Basketball teams in Thailand
Basketball teams established in 2015